"Conflict" is the fourth episode aired of the first series of UFO - a 1970 British television science fiction series about an alien invasion of Earth. Ruric Powell wrote the screenplay and it was directed by Ken Turner. The episode, initially titled "Ambush", was filmed between 2 July and 14 July 1969 and aired on the ATV Midlands network on 7 October 1970. Though shown as the fourth episode, it was actually the sixth to have been filmed.

The series was created by Gerry Anderson and Sylvia Anderson with Reg Hill, and produced by the Andersons and Lew Grade's Century 21 Productions for Grade's ITC Entertainment company.

Plot
Lunar Module 32, commanded by Steve Maddox, departs from the Moon bound for Earth; its radar picks up an unidentified object shortly before re-entry. The audience sees that this is a small alien limpet-like UFO, hiding in the Apollo 8 space wreck, which attaches to the passing LM 32 and interrupts communications with the SHADO Moonbase and modifies the spaceplane's course, causing the Lunar Module to re-enter the atmosphere at too steep an angle. The limpet UFO detaches from the stricken spacecraft, which explodes shortly after, and returns to its hiding place to await another victim.

Meanwhile, Straker is trying to convince General Henderson, head of the International Astrophysical Commission, to increase debris-eliminating space missions as he thinks that his pilots risk more in a month than Henderson's do in a year. Henderson mockingly accepts this but insists on activating the "Washington Square" protocol: the cancelation of all lunar spaceflights.

After Maddox's burial-in-space funeral at the Moonbase Paul Foster, convinced that it was not human error that killed his friend, blasts off in a lunar module against orders and flies on the same course to prove Maddox's innocence. As with LM 32, the limpet UFO attaches itself to Foster's module and interferes with the controls, proving his theory. Foster survives by deliberately entering the atmosphere at a very shallow angle which prevents the limpet UFO from steepening his spacecraft's descent enough to destroy it before it detaches and returns to hiding. Straker issues orders to destroy all space wrecks where the UFO might be located and invites Henderson to SHADO Control, having deduced that the limpet craft was some sort of lure.

In response a standard UFO prepares to attack the Harlington-Straker Studios but is soon destroyed by Sky One. Henderson is convinced of the merits of Straker's request to clear all space debris and agrees to support the plan but cautions Straker that, like himself, he may also have been too sure about being right.

Trivia
 "Steve Maddox" was the name of John Koenig in the first Space: 1999 script, "Zero-G".

Errors

 The space junk maps seen in the episode feature very few objects.
 The Spacecraft Lunar Module Adapter, which was probably seen only in photographs by the model maker, was misunderstood as some sort of hatch, as it is attached, semi-opened, at the S-IVB rocket stage of the Apollo 8 wreck.

Cast

Starring
 Ed Bishop — Col. Edward Straker, Commander-in-chief of SHADO
 Michael Billington — Col. Paul J. Foster
 Peter Gordeno — Capt. Peter Carlin
 Gabrielle Drake — Lt. Gay Ellis
 Wanda Ventham — Col. Virginia Lake
 Dolores Mantez — Lt. Nina Barry
 Gary Myers — Capt. Lew Waterman
 Keith Alexander — Lt. Keith Ford
 Ayshea — Lt. Ayshea Johnson
 Norma Ronald — Miss Ealand

Also Starring
 Grant Taylor — Gen. James L. Henderson, President of IAC

Featuring
 Drewe Henley — Captain Steve Maddox	
 Gerald Norman — Spacecraft pilot
 Alan Tucker — Space ship navigator	
 David Courtland — Maddox's lunar module crewman 
 Michael Kilgarriff — Joe Steiner	
 Louisa Rabaiotti — SHADO Operative

Production notes
Pinewood Studios, Buckinghamshire and Neptune House at ATV Elstree Studios, Borehamwood.

References

External links

1970 British television episodes
UFO (TV series) episodes